Cornelius Kelly (1949 – 5 April 1985) was an Irish hurler and Gaelic footballer. He played with club sides Cloughduv and Canovee, divisional side Muskerry and at inter-county level with the Cork senior teams.

Career

Kelly first played hurling with the Cloughduv minor team that won three successive divisional titles in the mid-1960s. He soon progressed to adult level and won a Cork JFC title with sister club Canovee in 1968. Kelly was the championship's top scorer when he added a Cork JHC title to his collection in 1970. He was also a member of the Muskerry divisional teams as a dual player that year and, after losing the SHC final, won a Cork SFC medal after a defeat of Nemo Rangers. Kelly enjoyed further club success when Canovee-Cloughduv completed an intermediate double in 1973. He ended his club career with a second Cork IHC title in 1983.

Kelly first played for Cork as a substitute on the minor team that lost the 1966 All-Ireland minor final to Wexford. He was again eligible for the minor grade the following year and won an All-Ireland MHC medal from left wing-forward when Wexford were beaten. Kelly's performances at club level resulted in a call-up to the under-21 team and he scored 2-07 when Wexford were beaten in the 1970 All-Ireland under-21 final replay. He was drafted onto the Cork senior teams as a dual player for the respective 1971 championships an won a Munster SFC medal after a defeat of Kerry. A recurring back problem resulted in Kelly's inter-county career coming to a premature end.

Personal life and death

Kelly was educated at Pallaskenry Agricultural College in Limerick and worked on the family farm in Farnanes, County Cork. He died suddenly on 5 April 1985, at the age of 36.

Honours

Canovee 
Cork Intermediate Football Championship: 1973
Cork Junior Football Championship: 1968
Mid Cork Junior A Football Championship: 1968

Cloughduv
Cork Intermediate Hurling Championship: 1973, 1983
Cork Junior Hurling Championship: 1970
Mid Cork Junior A Hurling Championship: 1967, 1970

Muskerry
Cork Senior Football Championship: 1970

Cork
Munster Senior Football Championship: 1971
Munster Junior Football Championship: 1971
All-Ireland Under-21 Hurling Championship: 1970
Munster Under-21 Hurling Championship: 1970
All-Ireland Minor Hurling Championship: 1967
Munster Minor Hurling Championship: 1966, 1967

References

1949 births
1985 deaths
Canovee Gaelic footballers
Cloughduv hurlers
Muskerry Gaelic footballers
Muskerry hurlers
Cork inter-county Gaelic footballers
Cork inter-county hurlers